Cluj-Napoca train station is the main railway station in Cluj-Napoca, Romania. It is located near the city center.

History
Two plaques on the building commemorate the 100th and 125th anniversary of the opening of the station on September 7, 1870.
The Cluj-Napoca railway station was designed and built by Hungarian architect Ferenc Pfaff, when the city was part of Kingdom of Hungary, Austro-Hungarian Empire.

Current situation 
The station is situated on the Căile Ferate Române line 300 Bucharest–Ploiești–Brașov–Teiuș–Cluj-Napoca–Oradea–Episcopia Bihor and the line Cluj-Napoca–Dej–Ilva Mică. , Cluj-Napoca railway station serves about 100 passenger trains, including domestic trains operated by Căile Ferate Române. Cluj-Napoca offers connections with the majority of Romanian cities, as well as service to Budapest, Hungary and Vienna, Austria.

Distance from other railway stations

References

External links

Railway stations in Romania
Buildings and structures in Cluj-Napoca
Railway stations opened in 1902